Douglas Cowie (1 May 1926 – 26 November 2021) was a Scottish footballer who played for Dundee, Greenock Morton and the Scotland national team. He played initially as a central defender but later converted to a left half.

Club career
Signed for Dundee by manager George Anderson, Cowie went on to play 341 times for the club in the Scottish Football League alone, many of them as captain. He was part of the Dundee side that won back-to-back League Cups in 1951–52 and 1952–53, also played in the 1952 Scottish Cup Final and was a member of the squad that missed out on winning the League Championship by one point in the 1948–49 season.

Cowie left Dundee in 1961 and had a two-year spell with Greenock Morton as a player-coach. He was Raith Rovers manager for the 1963–64 season but left the Kirkcaldy club to rejoin the Morton coaching staff in the summer of 1964. He later worked at Dundee United in coaching and scouting capacities.

On 3 April 2009, Cowie was inducted into Dundee's Hall of Fame.

International career
Cowie won all 20 of his Scotland caps while with Dundee. He made his international debut against England in April 1953. He was involved in Scotland's first two World Cup appearances, playing both matches in 1954 and two of three matches in 1958; Scotland's 3–2 defeat to Paraguay at the 1958 World Cup was his final appearance for Scotland. He also appeared once for the Scotland B team and three times for the Scottish League representative team.

Death
Cowie died on 26 November 2021, at the age of 95. He was the last surviving player of the 1954 and 1958 Scottish World Cup teams.

References

External links
Profile at Dundee-Mad.co.uk

1926 births
2021 deaths
Scottish footballers
Footballers from Aberdeen
Association football central defenders
Association football wing halves
Scotland international footballers
Scotland B international footballers
1954 FIFA World Cup players
1958 FIFA World Cup players
Scottish Football League players
Scottish Football League representative players
Dundee F.C. players
Greenock Morton F.C. players
Scottish Football League managers
Scottish football managers
Raith Rovers F.C. managers
Dundee United F.C. non-playing staff
Greenock Morton F.C. non-playing staff